Saint-Pierre-des-Corps is a commune in the French department of Indre-et-Loire, Centre-Val de Loire, France. It is located about 4 km (2.5 mi) from Tours. During the French Revolution, it was called La Clarté-Républicaine.

Population

Transportation
Located on the eastern edge of Tours, Saint-Pierre-des-Corps station is a major hub in the French railway network, connecting the  LGV Atlantique, used by high-speed trains traveling from Paris to Nantes, Bordeaux, and Toulouse. The station at Tours itself is a terminus station through which trains cannot pass, so trains that do not terminate at Tours tend to avoid it entirely, leaving Saint-Pierre-des-Corps as the principal long distance station for the entire metropolitan area.

See also
Communes of the Indre-et-Loire department

References

Communes of Indre-et-Loire